HDMS Prinds Christian Frederik was a ship of the line in the Royal Dano-Norwegian Navy.

Construction

The ship was built at Orlogsværftet on the islet of Nyholm off Copenhagen. It was designed by Frantz Hohlenberg. 1,600 oak trees were used in the construction of the ship. It was launched on 6 October 1804. The construction cost was approximately 12,000 rigsdaler.

Service
In 1806 and parts of the following year,  the ship operated as a training vessel in the North Sea and the Baltic Sea.

In the second half of 1807 the HDMS Prinds Christian Frederik was patrolling in Danish-Norwegian waters alongside the ship of the line  HDMS Lovise Augusta. After massive firefighting from the Christiansholm Fortress, the attack was reversed.

At the beginning of 1808, HDMS Prinds Christian Frederik was in Norway to carry supplies to the Royal Dano-Norwegian Army. Despite illness aboard, and with a large part of the crew newly replaced, the ship was ordered in March to protect the transfer of troops over the Great Belt (Storebælt).

On March 21, the ship was captured by a major British naval force during the Battle of Zealand Point, where she suffered 64 killed and 126 wounded in action; during the battle, she ran aground.

On March 23, the captured HMS Prinds Christian Frederik remained firmly aground despite British efforts to refloat it. After they had removed all the dead and wounded aboard the ship, the British decided to set fire to the immobile hulk instead upon realizing they were unable to move it. It blew up when the fire reached the ship's powder magazine, destroying the last Danish-Norwegian ship of the line in the Napoleonic Wars.

Commemoration

The anchor was for many years placed outside Stenstrup Museum. It was in 2002 moved to a new location in front of Annebjerggård. In 2021, it was moved to a barn where it will be restored. The anchor, a canon and a number of other artefacts from the ship will later be part of a new display about the Battle of Zealand in Odsherred Museum.

A model of this ship hangs in Odden Church, near the scene of the Battle of Zealand Point.

On 10 February 2023, Odsherred Museum will open a special exhibition about Willemoes and the Wreck.

Notes

References

Further reading
 Andersen, Helge: Orlogsskibet “Prinds Christian Frederik”. Article in Alle tiders Odsherred 1989. Odsherred Museum, Nykøbing Sjælland, 1989.
Orlogsskibet Prinds Christian Frederik, Dr. med. Helge Andersen, Nyboder Boghandel, 1993

Ships of the line of the Royal Dano-Norwegian Navy
Ships designed by Frantz Hohlenberg
Ships built in Copenhagen
1804 ships
Captured ships